The Stalin tunic or Stalinka is colloquial term for a type of tunic or jacket associated with Joseph Stalin; from the 1920s until the 1950s and beyond, it was commonly worn as a political uniform by government officials in the Soviet Union (and, after World War II, by officials in the Soviet satellite states as well).

History
Stalinka evolved from the french (френч), a tunic of the Imperial Russian Army, which had appeared in the First World War; the difference was that the Stalinka had a soft turn-down collar. Its simplistic style came from Stalin's refusal to wear clothing of a more complex nature, as well as eventual tweaks made by Soviet fashion designers that tried to create an image for the leader.

Influence
This style of the attire was picked by Chinese, Vietnamese and North Korean Communist leaders.

References

20th-century fashion
Military uniforms
Russian clothing
Stalinism